Héroes de Otra Patria (in English, Heroes from Another Country, or sometimes credited as Heroes without a Cause) is a 1998 Puerto Rican film, written and directed by Iván Dariel Ortíz. The film was selected as the Puerto Rican entry for the Best Foreign Language Film at the 71st Academy Awards, but was not accepted as a nominee.

The film follows the lives of two Puerto Rican soldiers in the middle of the Vietnam War. After being sent on a reconnaissance mission, their squad is ambushed and they get lost in the jungle. Meanwhile, we see the struggles being suffered by their relatives after their departure from the island.

Cast
 Jorge Castillo as Carlos
 Jimmy Navarro as Raúl
 Alba Raquel Barros as Doña Pura
 Adamari López as Esther
 Domingo Quiñones as Sgt. Miller
 Néstor Rodulfo as John

Awards
The film received an honorary mention at the Viña del Mar Festival in Chile.

See also
Cinema of Puerto Rico
List of films set in Puerto Rico
List of Puerto Ricans in the Academy Awards
List of submissions to the 71st Academy Awards for Best Foreign Language Film
List of Puerto Rican submissions for the Academy Award for Best Foreign Language Film

References

External links
 

1998 films
Puerto Rican films
Vietnam War films